Plectroglyphidodon leucozonus is a species of Perciformes in the family Pomacentridae.

References 

leucozonus
Animals described in 1859